M.C. A.D.E. (born Adrian Hines in Miami, Florida) is an American music producer and rapper who pioneered the hip hop subgenre of Miami bass music. His 1985 single, "Bass Rock Express", is considered to be the start of Miami bass. His single "Bass Mechanic" is also considered an example. He recorded on the 4-Sight record label, which was owned by his Dad Billy Hines, considered to be the first Independent Hip Hop label of the entire south. His name stands for Adrian Does Everything, which refers to the fact that he both rapped and produced his own records.

On Just Somethin to Do, M.C. A.D.E. recorded the song "Romantic Rhyme"; the song samples The Floaters' Float On.

Discography
 Just Somethin' to Do (1987)
 How Much Can You Take (1989)
 An All Out Bash (1991)
 In the Arms of Bass (1994)
 Ain't No Thang Like the Game (1996)

References

External links
 discogs site

American hip hop record producers
Living people
Rappers from Miami
21st-century American rappers
Year of birth missing (living people)